Ramygala (literally "quiet end") is a city in Lithuania. According to 2017 estimate, it had 1,440 residents.

History

The name "Ramygala" was first mentioned in the 13th century. In 1370 the place suffered from the Teutonic Knight attack. Sometime before 1500 the first church was built and in 1503 the name "Ramygala" was used to refer to a town. Since then Ramygala slowly grew. Few years later it had a manor, and at the end of the 16th century it received a privilege to host fairs. Unlike many other towns in Lithuania, Ramygala did not belong to a noble family but rather to Vilnius Cathedral and later to Vilnius University.

In 1781 the town established a parish school next to a new church after the old one was destroyed by fire. The school grew and expanded significantly in the 20th century. It built two new school buildings and a dorm. In 2005 it was named Ramygala Gymnasium. The school hosts a small museum dedicated to the local history and traditions. A new Neo Gothic church was built in 1897–1914. It has 3 aisles and 3 altars. It features only one bell tower. The tower was damaged during World War II, but was rebuilt in the 1950s.

Administration
Since the second half of the 18th century, Ramygala was administrative center of a valsčius. After the administrative reform by the Soviet authorities in 1950, the town became a capital of a raion (Lithuanian: rajonas). In 1962 Ramygala lost the status of the capital of a raion. Now it is a center of an eldership, the smallest administrative division in Lithuania. It has a small hospital and a library.

Famous people
The Venerable Mother Maria Kaupas (1880-1940), nun and founder of the Sisters of Saint Casimir
Mykolas Vrubliauskas (1919–1998), ceramics artist
Saulius Mykolaitis (1966–2006), actor

Famous places

References

 
 
 
 Bison paddock of Pašiliai

 
Cities in Lithuania
Cities in Panevėžys County
Ponevezhsky Uyezd
Panevėžys District Municipality